Symbion americanus is a species of primitive animals belonging to the family Symbiidae.

It is native to Northern America.

References

Further reading
 Obst, M.; Funch, P. & Kristensen, R.M. 2006: A new species of Cycliophora from the mouthparts of the American lobster, Homarus americanus (Nephropidae, Decapoda). Organisms diversity & evolution, 6: 83–97. 

Platyzoa